Edward Colman (1 November 1936 – 6 February 1958) was an English football player and one of the eight Manchester United players who lost their lives in the Munich air disaster.

Colman was born on Archie Street in Ordsall, Salford, Lancashire, the only child of plate player Richard Colman and his wife Elizabeth.

He joined Manchester United's youth team on leaving school in the summer of 1952. He became a first-team member at right-half during the 1955-56 season, ousting Jeff Whitefoot to play alongside Duncan Edwards. He finished the season with a Football League First Division title medal. He collected another league championship medal the following season, and also helped United reach the European Cup semi-finals. He played in the FA Cup final that season, but only collected a runners-up medal as United lost 2–1 to Aston Villa.

He made 108 first-team appearances for United, scoring two goals, the second of which came in the first leg of the fateful European Cup quarter-final tie against Red Star Belgrade. He died on 6 February 1958 in the crash at Munich airport after the plane stopped to refuel on the return flight.

In his time at United, he was nicknamed "Snakehips" for his trademark body swerve.

Aged 21 years and 3 months, he was the youngest of the 23 people to die. An accommodation building at the University of Salford is named after him – the Eddie Colman Court is a block of flats located near the main campus.

A statue of Colman was erected at his graveside in Weaste Cemetery, Weaste, Salford, after his death, but it was badly damaged by vandals within a few years and after being repaired was placed in the home of his father Dick. Dick, who died in October 1986 at the age of 76, is buried alongside Eddie and Eddie's mother Elizabeth, who died in November 1971 at the age of 62.

Twenty-seven workers at a Manchester boxmaking firm were dismissed from their jobs for leaving work to attend Colman's funeral, but were all soon reinstated.

Career statistics

References

1936 births
1958 deaths
Footballers from Salford
English footballers
Association football midfielders
Manchester United F.C. players
English Football League players
Footballers killed in the Munich air disaster
People from Ordsall
FA Cup Final players
Burials in North West England